The Diversity Group is a British organization which promotes equality and diversity and which was set up by founder and CEO, Paul Sesay, in 2006.

History 

Founded in 2006, The Diversity Group was set up to eliminate barriers to employment, education and training for diverse groups throughout the UK.

Predominantly aimed at diverse groups across several strands including Age, Disability, Gender, LGBT, Race and Religion, The Diversity Group runs a series of initiatives which promote opportunities for people living in the United Kingdom. Such opportunities are mainly presented through The Diversity Group Directory and The Diversity Group Jobsite.

In addition to this, The Diversity Group also celebrates the achievements of positive role models, entrepreneurs and community organizations across the equality and diversity sector. This is done through their annual awards ceremony, The National Diversity Awards.

Since 2015, The Diversity Group have also added The Excellence in Diversity Awards to their list of initiatives. This particular awards ceremony celebrates Inclusive Employers & Diversity Champions for their incredible work for Diversity & Inclusion.

The Diversity Group are also involved with several other initiatives, including diversity e-training, school workshops and recruitment fairs.

The Diversity Group directory 

The Diversity Group Directory is an annual publication. It was sent out to schools, libraries, job centres, youth & community groups, city councils, race equality councils and citizens advice bureaus across the United Kingdom. The directory provides information about equal rights, legislation and helpful links. It is helpful for people who need advice on specific problems and issues. Which are frequently discussed within the equality and diversity sector.

The directory was initially published as Urban UK in 2009 before switching to its current title, The Diversity Group Directory.

Chevron served as a sponsor for The Diversity Group Directory for two years, 2011 and 2012. The Diversity Group 2014 Directory, in association with the National Diversity Awards 2014, is sponsored by Farnell element14.

TDG jobsite 

The official Diversity Group website contains a Job site. It promotes job opportunities from organizations that advertise through The Diversity Group Directory.

Microsoft, Sky, Lloyds Banking Group, MI5, Financial Ombudsman Service, First Group Plc and Arts Council England are among the organizations included on the TDG jobsite . Other organizations that have advertised job opportunities through the TDG Jobsite include city councils, universities, housing associations and many other employers across the jobs sector.

The National Diversity Awards 

Established in 2012, The National Diversity Awards in association with Microsoft is a British awards ceremony dedicated to celebrating positive role models, entrepreneurs and community associations for their achievements within the equality and diversity sector.

The Awards were a part of an annual celebration held across multiple venues across the United Kingdom. Honours are distributed in five different strands. It includes Age, Disability, Gender, LGBT, Race, Faith & Religion.

The National Diversity Awards started their life in 2012 and were held at The Midland Hotel in Manchester before moving to the Queen's Hotel in Leeds in 2013. The National Diversity Awards 2014 were presented at The Hurlingham Club in London on 26 September 2014. The fourth annual National Diversity Awards will be held at The Anglican Cathedral in Liverpool on 18 September 2015.

Past award winners include inspirational figures such as Peter Tatchell and James Partridge OBE. Both won the Lifetime Achiever award in 2012 and 2013, respectively. The Awards also honours organizations, with The Co-operative Group and Farnell element14 being respective winners of the 2012 and 2013 Diverse Company awards.

Since its launch, The National Diversity Awards has attracted the support of a number of celebrity patrons and endorsers. Celebrity patrons of the Awards have included Misha B and Cerrie Burnell, who now hosts the Awards along with Big Brother winner, and television presenter, Brian Dowling. Celebrity endorsers include Stephen Fry, Beverley Knight, Trevor Nelson, Meera Syal, Brian Blessed, Gareth Thomas, Katie Piper and Ade Adepitan amongst others.

The Excellence in Diversity Awards

The Excellence in Diversity Awards is an award ceremony that honours Inclusive Employers & Diversity Champions across all five sectors. It is held annually at various venues across the United Kingdom.

Paul Sesay, the current CEO, founded it. who's the founder and CEO of I Spoil U Media, The National Diversity Awards and The Diversity Group, The Excellence in Diversity Awards was launched in 2015.

The Excellence in Diversity Awards 2015 took place at The Midland Hotel in Manchester on 14 May.

References

Anti-racist organisations in the United Kingdom
Organizations established in 2006
2006 establishments in the United Kingdom